The 2014 season was Remo's 100th existence. The club participated in the Campeonato Brasileiro Série D, the Campeonato Paraense, the Copa Verde and the Copa do Brasil.

Remo finished outside of the top four of the Campeonato Brasileiro Série D, after being eliminated in the round of 16 by Brasiliense 3-2 on aggregate. The club won the Campeonato Paraense after six years, totalizing 43 titles of the championship. In the Copa Verde, Remo was eliminated in the semi-finals by Paysandu 1-0 on aggregate. In the Copa do Brasil, the club was eliminated in the first round by Internacional.

Players
Players marked  left the club during the playing season.

Kit
Supplier: Umbro

Transfers in

Transfers out

Competitions

Campeonato Brasileiro Série D

Group stage

Matches

Knockout stage

Round of 16

Notes

Campeonato Paraense

First round

Matches

Final stage

Semi-finals

Finals

Second round

Matches

Final stage

Semi-finals

Finals

Finals

Copa Verde

Round of 16

Quarter-finals

Semi-finals

Copa do Brasil

First round

References

External links
Official Site 
Remo 100% 

2014 season
Clube do Remo seasons
Brazilian football clubs 2014 season